Yevhen Serhiyovych Past (born 16 March 1988) is a Ukrainian professional footballer who plays as a goalkeeper for Chornomorets Odesa.

Club career

Early years
He is a product of the Chornomorets Odesa academy and played for the club's reserve squad and youth squad.

Chornomorets Odesa
Past was born in Odesa, Soviet Union. A Chornomorets Odesa youth product, he initially played for the club's reserves making his first appearance in the 2005–06 season. He made his first-team debut in a Ukrainian Premier League match against SC Tavriya Simferopol on 28 February 2010.

On the season 2010–11 he got promoted  to Ukrainian Premier League and in the season 2012–13, he got into the final of Ukrainian Cup against Shakhtar Donetsk.

Yevhen Past got to the Round of 32, of the Europe League in the season 2013–14 and he played 2 games against Lyon.

Zirka Kropyvnytskyi
In 2015 Past moved to Zirka Kropyvnytskyi and in the season 2015–16 he won the Ukrainian First League.

Desna Chernihiv
In 2018 Past moved Premier League side FC Desna Chernihiv. Here he found Andriy Mostovyi that he played with him in Zirka Kropyvnytskyi.

In the 2019–20 season Past saved a penalty by Benjamin Verbič in a Ukrainian Premier League match against Dynamo Kyiv at the Chernihiv Stadium. He also saved a penalty by Vitaliy Havrysh in a Championship round match against Kolos Kovalivka helping his club win 2–0. He saved another penalty in the Championship round on 6 June 2020, from by Shakhtar Donetsk's Marlos.

In the 2019–20 season he was the goalkeeper with most clean sheets in 11 matches together with the international Ukrainian goalkeeper Andriy Pyatov. He was also the goalkeeper with most minutes played in 30 games, in the  2019–20 season and included in the best squad of the Ukrainian Premier League of the season 2019–20 season.

Past with the club of Chernihiv qualified for the first time in the history of the club for the Europa League third qualifying round. On 14 August 2020, Past extended his contract with Desna for two years.

On 24 September Past played again in UEFA Europa League, he was included as the first goalkeeper in the team of Desna Chernihiv against VfL Wolfsburg for the Europa League third qualifying round at the AOK Stadion. On 6 December 2020 during the winning victory of 1–0 against Vorskla Poltava at the Stadion Yuri Gagarin, Past riched 150 caps in Ukrainian Premier League. Past got the 7th place in the Ukrainian Footballer of the Year in 2020 and he was the best goalkeeper in Ukraine

On 5 July 2021, after three amazing years he ended the cooperation with FC Desna Chernihiv.

Dnipro-1
On 5 July 2021 he signed two years contract with Dnipro-1 in Ukrainian Premier League.

Chornomorets Odesa
In January 2022, he moved Chornomorets Odesa, where on 22 January 2022, he made his debut with the new club in the friendly match against Prishtina.

Outside of professional football
In March 2022, during the Siege of Chernihiv, Past helped to provide Chernihiv defenders with thermal underwear. The footballer also transferred to the account of volunteers the funds that will be spent for the needs of the Armed Forces.

Career statistics

Club

Honours
Chornomorets Odesa
 Ukrainian First League: 2010–11 
 Ukrainian Cup runners-up: 2012–13
 Ukrainian Super Cup runners-up: 2013

Zirka Kropyvnytskyi
 Ukrainian First League: 2015–16

Individual
 Most clean sheets in Ukrainian Premier League: 2019–20 (shared with Andriy Pyatov)

Gallery

References

External links
 
 
 

1988 births
Living people
Footballers from Odesa
Association football goalkeepers
Ukrainian footballers
FC Chornomorets Odesa players
FC Zirka Kropyvnytskyi players
FC Desna Chernihiv players
SC Dnipro-1 players
Ukrainian Premier League players
Ukrainian First League players